Wizja Le Cinema was a Polish movie channel featuring famous and less known film productions from Europe and the rest of the world. Over the years, the owner, name, form and availability of the channel have changed. Initially, it was a channel of Wizja TV, available only on this platform and some cable networks. In fact, the channel only broadcast European films, though the productions from other parts of the world were rare on the channel. After merging Wizja TV with Cyfra+, the channel did not enter into the offer of the new platform. The name was also changed into Le Cinema and appeared in the rival Cyfrowy Polsat offer.

On April 19, 2003 the name was changed into Europa Europa.

References

External links

Defunct television channels in Poland
Television channels and stations established in 1999
Television channels and stations disestablished in 2003
1999 establishments in Poland
2003 disestablishments in Poland
Polish-language television stations
Mass media in Warsaw